Coleophora antennariella is a moth of the family Coleophoridae. It is found from Great Britain to Romania, Poland, the Baltic states and northern Russia and from Fennoscandia to France, Italy and Hungary.

Adults are on wing in May in one generation per year.

The larvae feed on the seeds of hairy wood-rush (Luzula pilosa) living in a moveable case.

References

antennariella
Moths described in 1861
Moths of Europe
Taxa named by Gottlieb August Wilhelm Herrich-Schäffer